Adam Thomas Mitchell (born 1 June 1996) is a New Zealand footballer who plays as a defender for ISPS Handa Premiership club Auckland City.

Club career
Born in Vrgorac, Croatia, to a New Zealand father and Bosnian Croat mother, thus having both New Zealand and Croatian citizenship. He grew up in Hobsonville in West Auckland, and began playing for Waitakere City before later moving to Central United (2013), starting as a midfielder before becoming a centre back. He was also a member of Wynton Rufer's Wynrs academy as a youngster.

Mitchell played three seasons in the New Zealand Football Championship, two seasons with Wanderers SC and one with WaiBOP United. Mitchell captained the Wanderers SC team that was formed to give the under-20s regular game time in the NZFC. He was also team-captain at WaiBOP United.

In summer 2016, he moved abroad, to Europe, where after trials, he signed a contract with Serbian giants Red Star Belgrade. He signed on 25 May 2016, a 1+2 years contract with Red Star. Due to his young age, in order to increase his chances to play, at final days of the Serbian 2016 summer transfer-window, he was loaned to OFK Beograd. He debuted with OFK in the 2016–17 Serbian First League on 10 September, in a home game against Inđija, a 1–0 win.

On 13 February 2017, he moved to Slovenian side NK Celje.

In the 2017–18 season he was a regular in the U23 squad of the Football League Championship side Bolton Wanderers. Following his release at the end of the season and a period training with Walsall and Swedish club Kalmar FF, on 12 February 2019 Mitchell signed with New Zealand club Team Wellington until the end of the season.

International career
Mitchell represented New Zealand at U-17 and U-20 levels. He was part of the squad that won the 2013 OFC U-17 Championship, and was part of New Zealand's squad for the 2013 FIFA U-17 World Cup and the 2015 FIFA U-20 World Cup.

Mitchell was called up to the New Zealand national team twice in 2015 under Anthony Hudson as an injury replacement. He made his debut under Fritz Schmid on 24 March 2018 in a friendly game against Canada.

Career statistics

Club

Honours
New Zealand U-17
OFC U-17 Championship: 2013 (winner)

References

External links
 

1996 births
Living people
People from Vrgorac
New Zealand people of Croatian descent
Croatian people of New Zealand descent
Association football central defenders
Croatian footballers
New Zealand association footballers
New Zealand youth international footballers
New Zealand under-20 international footballers
New Zealand international footballers
Wanderers Special Club players
WaiBOP United players
Red Star Belgrade footballers
OFK Beograd players
NK Celje players
Bolton Wanderers F.C. players
Team Wellington players
Auckland City FC players
New Zealand Football Championship players
Serbian First League players
New Zealand expatriate association footballers
Expatriate footballers in Serbia
New Zealand expatriate sportspeople in Serbia
Expatriate footballers in Slovenia
Expatriate footballers in England
New Zealand expatriate sportspeople in England